Rana Fotballklubb is a Norwegian association football club located in Mo i Rana, Nordland. The club was founded 4 December 2017 as a merger of Mo IL and the football section of IL Stålkameratene. The team currently plays in 3. divisjon, the fourth tier of the Norwegian football league system.

History
Although the merger was agreed 29 November 2017, Mo and Stålkameratene would continue to field their own tems in the 2018 season, as the merger would not effect before the 2019 season. Rana therefore played their first season in the 2019 4. divisjon. They won 15 out of their 16 games and were promoted to the 3. divisjon.

Recent seasons
{|class="wikitable"
|-bgcolor="#efefef"
! Season
!
! Pos.
! Pl.
! W
! D
! L
! GS
! GA
! P
!Cup
!Notes
|-
|2019
|4. divisjon
|align=right bgcolor=#DDFFDD| 1
|align=right|16||align=right|15||align=right|1||align=right|0
|align=right|72||align=right|15||align=right|46
|Second qualifying round
|Promoted to 3. divisjon
|}

References

Football clubs in Norway
Sport in Nordland
Association football clubs established in 2017
2017 establishments in Norway
Rana, Norway